Chem Campbell (born 30 December 2002) is a footballer who plays as a winger for Wycombe Wanderers on loan from Wolverhampton Wanderers. Born in England, he is a former youth international for Wales.

Club career
Campbell made his professional debut for Wolverhampton Wanderers, on 30 October 2019 in a 2–1 defeat against Aston Villa in the EFL Cup.

Campbell made his Premier League debut as a second-half substitute in 1–0 loss away to Newcastle United on 8 April 2022.

On 30 January 2023, Campbell joined League One club Wycombe Wanderers on loan until the end of the season.

International career
Born in England, Campbell is of Jamaican and Welsh descent. He played for the Wales U17s in 2018.

Career statistics

References

2002 births
Living people
Welsh people of Jamaican descent
English people of Welsh descent
English sportspeople of Jamaican descent
Welsh footballers
English footballers
Footballers from Birmingham, West Midlands
Association football midfielders
Wales youth international footballers
Premier League players
Wolverhampton Wanderers F.C. players
Wycombe Wanderers F.C. players